This is an incomplete list of men's Maccabiah medalists in track & field athletics from 1932 to the present.

Current program

100 metres

110 metres hurdles

200 metres

400 meters

400 metres hurdles

800 metres

1500 metres

5000 metres

10K run (road race)

4×100 metre relay

4×400 metre relay

Half marathon (excluding masters divisions)

High jump

Pole vault

Long jump

Triple jump

Discus throw

Shot put

Javelin throw

Hammer throw

Discontinued events

200 metres hurdles

3000 meters race walk

20 kilometers race walk

50 kilometers race walk

Decathlon

References

Athletics (men)
Lists of medalists in athletics
Sport of athletics-related lists